New York's 65th State Assembly district is one of the 150 districts in the New York State Assembly. It has been represented by Democrat Grace Lee since 2023, succeeding Yuh-Line Niou.

Geography

2020s

2022
District 65 is located in Manhattan, comprising Chinatown and the Lower East Side.

2012-2022
District 65 is located in Manhattan, comprising Chinatown, the Financial District, Battery Park City, and the Lower East Side.

Recent election results

2022

2020

2018

2016

2016 special

2014

2012

References 

65